Dhad may refer to:
 Dihydroxy-acid dehydratase, an enzyme
 Dhad, Maharashtra, a village in Maharashtra, India
 Dhadd, an hourglass-shaped traditional musical instrument 
 Raid (military), in Hindi language
 Ḍād, a letter of the Arabic alphabet